Paul Kerensa (born 1979 in Truro, Cornwall) is an English comedy writer and stand-up comedian. He studied at Royal Grammar School, Guildford and the Guildford School of Acting. In 2002 Kerensa won ITV's 'Take The Mike' Award, and was a finalist in The Daily Telegraph Open Mic Awards and the BBC New Comedy Awards. Kerensa won the BBC Radio Titheridge Prize, leading to writing credits on many major BBC Radio 4 shows. He wrote, and briefly appeared in, the television series Miranda.  He was a co-writer on the television series Not Going Out.

He appeared regularly on the segment "Pause for Thought", during The Chris Evans Breakfast Show on BBC Radio 2. Kerensa was writer on the 2015 series of TFI Friday.  he was hired by Chris Evans as a writer on the 2016 series of Top Gear.

In 2013 Kerensa authored the book So A Comedian Walks Into A Church: Confessions of a Kneel-Down Stand-up, followed in 2014 by "Genesis: The Bibluffer's Guide".

References

External links
 
 

1979 births
People educated at Royal Grammar School, Guildford
English comedy writers
People from Guildford
People from Truro
Living people
Writers from Cornwall